The Frederick County Council and the Frederick County Executive are, respectively, the elected representatives of the legislative and executive branches of the county government of Frederick County, Maryland, United States. Offices are located in Winchester Hall in the county seat, Frederick.

Formation
Until 2014, Frederick County was governed by county commissioners. On December 1, 2014, Frederick County transitioned to a "charter home rule government". The voters approved this governmental change on November 6, 2012 election with 62,469 voting for the transition and 37,368 voting against.

County executive
A county executive is responsible for providing direction, supervision, and administrative oversight of all executive departments, agencies, and offices.

Jan H. Gardner was elected the first Frederick County Executive in 2014. She was reelected in 2018.

County Council
A county council has seven members: five based on district and two at-large.
The members of the Frederick County Council are as follows.

See also
Maryland county executive elections, 2018

References

Frederick County, Maryland
County government in Maryland